KADS (1240 AM, "The Sports Animal") is a radio station licensed to serve Elk City, Oklahoma, United States. The station, established in 1929, is currently owned by Paragon Communications, Inc.

KADS broadcasts a sports format, largely as a simulcast of WWLS-FM (98.1 FM) in Oklahoma City, Oklahoma.

The station was assigned the KADS call sign by the Federal Communications Commission.

Translators

References

External links

ADS
Sports radio stations in the United States
Radio stations established in 1932
Beckham County, Oklahoma